Mompha eloisella, the red-streaked mompha, is a species of momphid moth in the family Momphidae.

The MONA or Hodges number for Mompha eloisella is 1443.

References

Further reading

External links

 

Momphidae
Moths described in 1860